The Flechas (Portuguese for Arrows) were an elite paramilitary tactical unit of the Portuguese secret police (PIDE, latter renamed DGS) that operated in Angola and Mozambique during the Portuguese Colonial War. Unlike most of the other Portuguese special forces that were employed in the several theatres of operations of the conflict, the Flechas were not a de jure military unit but a PIDE/DGS (secret police) unit.

Flechas were organized as platoon-sized units consisting of local tribesmen and rebel defectors who specialised in black operation, clandestine operation, close-quarters combat, counterinsurgency, covert operation, desert warfare, direct action, irregular warfare, pseudo-operations, jungle warfare, raiding and kidnapping high-value target, special operations, special reconnaissance, tracking, and urban warfare. They sometimes patrolled in captured uniforms and were rewarded with cash bounties for every guerrilla or guerrilla weapon they captured.

Flechas had a reputation for atrocities, brutality, torture, and summary executions.

History
Flechas units were created and employed in Angola, during the Portuguese Colonial War, under the command of the PIDE (renamed DGS in 1969). Despite being a paramilitary police force, they were thus a police unit, not being under military command as the remaining special force.

Composed of locally recruited men, often former guerrilla fighters but mostly bushman Khoisan, the units specialised in reconnaissance, tracking, unconventional tactics, and pseudo-terrorist operations.

The Flechas were created and organized by Sub-Inspector Oscar Cardoso, when he was the head of the PIDE branch at Serpa Pinto, Angola (present day Menongue). Initially, the unit was intended to support the activities of the branch, whose area of responsibility covered the remote eastern areas of Angola that the Portuguese called Terras do Fim do Mundo (Lands of the End of the World) and which corresponded to the Frente Leste theater. In this theater, they achieved a great success in the early 1970s, contributing for the virtual Portuguese victory in the campaign.

The success of the initial Flechas unit created by Oscar Cardoso, made PIDE/DGS to expand the concept and to created new groups attached to other of its local branches.

General Costa Gomes – Portuguese Commander-in-Chief in Angola – argued that African soldiers were cheaper, knew  the terrain better, and were better able to create a relationship with the local populace, a tactic that predates the 'hearts and minds' strategy later used by United States forces in Vietnam at the time.

Flechas units were also created and operated in Mozambique at the very end stages of the conflict, following the dismissal of Kaúlza de Arriaga on the eve of the Portuguese coup in 1974. The units were to continue to cause problems for the FRELIMO even after independence and Portuguese withdrawal, when the country splintered into civil war.

The Flechas served as model for the latter created Rhodesian Selous Scouts and the South African Koevoet.

Organization
The Flechas were organized in combat groups (platoons) of about 30 men, although the formation was often loose. Each of these groups was dependent from a PIDE / DGS local branch, operating in its area of responsibility.

Uniforms and equipment
The Flechas received combat uniforms identical to those worn by the Portuguese Armed Forces, in the Portuguese vertical lizard pattern camouflage. With this uniform, they wore a beret with the same camouflage pattern. This non standard camouflage beret became their most distinctive uniform item. In parade, the Flechas also wore neck scarves and metal tabs in the left shoulder with the name of the unit. Allegedly, in some operations, they wore enemy uniforms in order not to be identified.

The Flechas were also mostly armed with the standard small arms in use by the Portuguese Military, including the Heckler & Koch G3 and FN FAL 7.62×51mm battle rifles. They also frequently used captured AK-47 rifles and they showed a special preference for the use of tribal traditional weapons, including spears and the bows and arrows which gave origin to the name of the unit.

After independence

In 1975 a group of ex-Flechas who had fled Mozambique after its Independence formed the insurgent group RENAMO and subsequently fought in the Mozambique Civil War. Other Flechas were enlisted in the Rhodesian Army's Selous Scouts.

Other special forces units
There were, in fact, a number of Portuguese special forces units that were unique to the Portuguese Colonial War:

 Special Groups (Grupos Especiais): units similar to the ones used in Angola
 Paratrooper Special Groups (Grupos Especiais Pára-Quedistas): units of volunteer black soldiers that had paratrooper training
 Combat Tracking Special Groups (Grupos Especiais de Pisteiros de Combate): special units trained in tracking

See also
Koevoet
Selous Scouts
RENAMO

Footnotes

Works cited 

Special forces of Portugal
Military history of Angola
Portuguese Colonial War
1970s in Angola
Counterinsurgency
Irregular units and formations
Military units and formations of the Cold War
Indigenous counterinsurgency forces